Keep the Faith is the second album by American singer Faith Evans. It was released by Bad Boy Records on October 27, 1998 in the United States. Almost entirely written and produced by Evans, the album garnered generally mixed to positive reviews by music critics, with AllMusic noting it "without a doubt a highlight of 1990s soul-pop music." Also enjoying commercial success, it went platinum and produced the top ten singles "Love Like This" and "All Night Long," prompting Evans to start an 18-city theater tour with Dru Hill and Total the following year.

Background
Two years in the making, Evans' second solo effort, Keep the Faith, was released during October 27, 1998. Almost entirely written and produced by her, Evans considered the album difficult to complete as she had initially felt discouraged about the progress at first.

Critical reception

AllMusic editor Jose F. Promis rated the album three stars out of five. He found that "Evans shines when she sings fast or mid-tempo songs, but the ballads weigh too heavily on this otherwise fine album [...] However, the classy Ms. Evans possesses a beautiful voice, is a gifted songwriter, and happily steers clear of the tacky clichés that burden so much contemporary R&B. So despite the heavy reliance on ballads, this is actually a fine album, and is without a doubt a highlight of 1990s soul-pop music." Matt Diehl from Entertainment Weekly noted that Keep the Faith "remains commercial R&B, all bedroom strings and Babyface-style acoustic accents. What sets Evans apart is that she, like her soul sista Mary J. Blige, investigates her pain in a way that contradicts the lush sonics [...] It’s a far richer palette than her slicker peers offer; then again, we forget that Stevie, Marvin, and Aretha's soul was considered 'com-mercial' too. While Evans hasn’t hit their heights, efforts like this give us faith that she might.

Los Angeles Times noted that "however heartfelt Evans’ intentions may be in this homage to her late husband, the Notorious B.I.G., she seems more concerned with soliciting our empathy than with creating compelling R&B." Yahoo! Music critic Billy Johnson, Jr. felt that "only a few Keep the Faith songs have the potential to keep the talented vocalist at the top of the charts." Ernest Hardy from Rolling Stone felt that the album lacked song worthy of Evans' talent. He felt thath she "deserves to be known as more than the femme fatale in some bullshit hip-hop feud, and Keep the Faith is a strong reminder that she has the talent. All she lacks are the songs." Similarly, Craig Seymour remarked in his review for Village Voice: "Though there's much great singing on Keep the Faith, there are too few great or even good songs. While the mostly self-penned tunes on her debut at least had a fluid quality befitting her dewy vocals, on Keep the Faith they just seem aimless. If you're not paying attention to every twist and turn of her spiraling melismas, the album passes by like a summer breeze, pleasant but neither distinctive nor memorable."

Commercial performance
Keep the Faith debuted and peaked at number six on the US Billboard 200 in the week of November 14, 1998. Evans' first top ten album, it scored first week sales of 85,000 copies. By December 1998, the album had sold 251,000 units. On July 29, 1999, Keep the Faith was cerified Platinum by the Recording Industry Association of America (RIAA).

Track listing

Samples
 "Keep the Faith" samples "Never Alone" by Yolanda Adams
 "Life Will Pass You By" samples "Gotta Make It Up to You" by Angela Bofill
 "Love Like This" samples "Chic Cheer" by Chic
 "Sunny Days" samples "I'm Back for More" by Al Johnson and Jean Carne
 "All Night Long" samples "I Hear Music in the Streets" by Unlimited Touch

Personnel

Performers and musicians
 Faith Evans – arranger, vocal arrangement, vocals, vocals (background)
 Michael Thompson – guitar
 Michael Hart Thompson – guitar
 Babyface – drum programming, keyboards, vocals (background)
 Damon Thomas – drum programming, keyboards
 Mike Mason – piano, strings
 Greg Phillinganes – piano
 Nathan East – bass guitar
 Ricky Lawson – drums

 112 – arranger, performer, vocal arrangement
 Diddy – performer
 Kelly Price – arranger, vocal arrangement, vocals (background)
 Axel Niehaus – arranger, vocal arrangement
 Carl Thomas – vocal arrangement
 Kenya Ivey – vocals (background)
 Tavia Ivey – vocals (background)
 Lorne Rawls – arranger
 DJ Rodgers – arranger
 Mario Winans – overdubs

Technical

 Charles "Prince Charles" Alexander – engineer, mixing
 Tony Black – engineer, mixing
 Axel Niehaus – engineer, mixing
 Paul Boutin – engineer
 Tom Cassel – engineer
 Joe "Smilin' Joe" Perrera – engineer
 Rob Paustian – engineer
 Thom Russo – engineer
 Doug Wilson – engineer
 E'lyk – assistant engineer, mixing
 Jon Gass – mixing
 Tony Maserati – mixing
 Michael Patterson – editing
 Herb Powers – mastering
 Gwendolyn Niles – project manager

 Faith Evans – executive producer, producer
 Sean "Puffy" Combs – executive producer, producer
 Deric "D-Dot" Angelettie – associate executive producer
 Babyface – producer
 Mike Mason – producer
 Ron Lawrence – producer
 Carl Thompson – producer
 David Foster – producer, vocal producer
 Richard "Younglord" Frierson – producer
 Todd Russaw – associate executive producer
 Jesse Rivera – project coordinator
 Albert Watson – photography
 Gwynnis Mosby – make-up
 Klya Wright – hair stylist

Charts

Weekly charts

Year-end charts

Certifications

References

External links

 
 

1998 albums
Faith Evans albums
Bad Boy Records albums
Albums produced by Babyface (musician)
Albums produced by Sean Combs